Thesium pyrenaicum is a species in the genus Thesium of the sandalwood family, Santalaceae. The genera and species of this family are usually semiparasites feeding on other plants. T. pyrenaicum or meadowflax is a perennial herb between 15 and 50 cm.high. It occurs in Western Europe. With standing stem(s) the leaves are lineal, with three veins, alternate, without stipules. The flowers, with 3-5 petals, are tube-shaped, and bloom in June and July. The petal tops roll in during the fruiting season. It has 5-9 stamen with distinct ovaries. The seeds are nutlike. The fruit is shorter than the flower.

References

External links

Santalaceae
Plants described in 1788